Tippecanoe is an unincorporated community in Tippecanoe Township, Marshall County, Indiana, United States.

History
Tippecanoe was settled beginning in 1882. The original town was located 1 mile to the north and was platted as Tippecanoe Town in 1850, named for the Tippecanoe River to the south. After the railroad was built 1 mile south, the town was relocated. The original Tippecanoe Town was renamed Old Tip Town.

Benack's Village was located 1.4 mile (2.3 km) ENE from Tippecanoe, across the Tippecanoe River in what is now Potawatomi Wildlife Park.

Geography
It is named for the Tippecanoe River, which runs on the north side of town. Indiana Highway 331 passes through the town.

Education
 Triton School Corporation
 Argos Community Schools
 Tippecanoe Valley School Corporation

Notable residents
 Donald V. Fites - Former President & CEO of Caterpillar Inc.
 Paul & Joyce Hensley - Founders of Hensley Fabricating & Equipment Co. Inc.

Gallery

References

Unincorporated communities in Marshall County, Indiana
Unincorporated communities in Indiana